Jøkulkyrkja Mountain ("the Glacier Church"), also known as Massiv Yakova Gakkelya, is a broad, ice-topped mountain with several radial rock spurs, standing east of Lunde Glacier in the Mühlig-Hofmann Mountains of Queen Maud Land, East Antarctica.
 At  elevation, it is the highest elevation in Queen Maud Land, and also the highest elevation within the claims of Norway. The mountain is located on the Princess Astrid Coast of the Norwegian Antarctic Territory. Håhellerskarvet ("shark cave mountain"), is located to the southwest; the two peaks are separated by the 25-mile-long Lunde Glacier, which flows to the northwest.

Discovery and naming
Jøkulkyrkja Mountain was plotted from surveys and air photos by the Sixth Norwegian Antarctic Expedition (1956–60) and named Jøkulkyrkja. The first element is jøkul m 'small glacier', the last element is the finite form of kyrkje f 'church'. (Like other names in the Norwegian Arctic and Antarctic islands and areas the Nynorsk form of Norwegian is used in the name - the Bokmål form would have been *Jøkelkirken or *Jøkelkirka).

Mountaineering significance
The first ascent of Jøkulkyrkja Mountain was in January 1994, by a team of 13 mountain climbers led by Ivar Tollefsen. The first woman to reach the top was Merete Asak, November 2010.

See also
 List of mountains of Queen Maud Land

References

External links
 Scientific Committee on Antarctic Research (SCAR)

Jokulkyrkja Mountain
Princess Astrid Coast